Timeline of the COVID-19 pandemic in Russia may refer to:

 Timeline of the COVID-19 pandemic in Russia (January–June 2020)
 Timeline of the COVID-19 pandemic in Russia (July–December 2020)
 Timeline of the COVID-19 pandemic in Russia (2021)
 Timeline of the COVID-19 pandemic in Russia (2022)

Russia